María Gabriela Rivera Corado (born 22 December 2001), known as Gabriela Rivera, is a Guatemalan tennis player.

On the juniors tour, Rivera has a career high ITF junior combined ranking of 35, achieved on 26 February 2018.

As of October 2021, she was ranked n. 1383 in the world by the WTA.

Rivera represents Guatemala in the Fed Cup.

ITF Finals

Singles: 1 title

Notes

References

External links
  
 Ma. Gabriela Rivera at CoreTennis.net
 
 
 

2001 births
Living people
Guatemalan female tennis players
Tennis players at the 2018 Summer Youth Olympics